The 1992 Pilkington Glass Championships was a women's tennis tournament played on grass courts at the Devonshire Park Lawn Tennis Club in Eastbourne in the United Kingdom that was part of Tier II of the 1992 WTA Tour. It was the 18th edition of the tournament and was held from 15 June until 20 June 1992. Lori McNeil, seeded 11th, won the singles title and earned $70,000 first-prize money.

Finals

Singles
 Lori McNeil defeated  Linda Harvey-Wild 6–4, 6–4.
 It was McNeil's first singles title of the year and the eighth of her career.

Doubles
 Jana Novotná /  Larisa Savchenko defeated  Mary Joe Fernandez /  Zina Garrison-Jackson 6–0, 6–3.
 It was Novotná's third doubles title of the year and the 36th of her career. It was Savchenko's fifth doubles title of the year and the 34th of her career.

References

External links
 ITF tournament edition details
 Tournament draws

Pilkington Glass Championships
Eastbourne International
Pilkington Glass Championships
Pilkington Glass Championships
1992 in English tennis